Kirengeshoma palmata, the yellow wax bells, is a species of flowering plant in the family Hydrangeaceae, native to Japan and eastern China (Huangshan and Tianmushan). It is a calcifuge, suitable for cultivation in a shady, moist location in acid soil.

References

Hydrangeaceae
Flora of China
Flora of Japan